Portage Township is the name of some places in the U.S. state of Michigan:

 Portage Township, Houghton County, Michigan
 Portage Township, Mackinac County, Michigan

See also 
 Portage, Michigan, a city in Kalamazoo County incorporated from the entirety of the former Portage Township.

Michigan township disambiguation pages